Jean-Michel Atlan (January 23, 1913 – February 12, 1960) was a French artist.

Biography
Of Algerian Jewish descent, Atlan was born in Constantine, French Algeria, and moved to Paris in 1930. He studied philosophy at the Sorbonne. He started as a self-taught painter in 1941. He was arrested for being Jewish and for his political activism in 1942. He pleaded insanity and was confined to the Sainte Anne asylum. He published a slim volume of poetry in 1944 and had his first exhibition at the Gallerie Arc en Ciel. In 1946 he met Asger Jorn and got involved with the CoBrA art group. His studio became a meeting place for the group in Paris.

In 1955 he exhibited in the Gallerie Carpenter. Two of the works he is known for include Le Kahena, and Composition.

He died in Paris and is buried in the Cimetière du Montparnasse.

Notes

External links
Biography, pictures at Galerie Birch famous for COBRA

  Jean-Michel Atlan

People from Constantine, Algeria
Modern painters
1913 births
1960 deaths
University of Paris alumni
Burials at Montparnasse Cemetery
20th-century French painters
20th-century French male artists
French male painters
Abstract painters
French watercolourists
Migrants from French Algeria to France
French abstract artists